The 2014 European U23 Judo Championships is an edition of the European U23 Judo Championships, organised by the European Judo Union. It was held in Wrocław, Poland from 14 to 16 November 2014.

Medal summary

Medal table

Men's events

Women's events

Source Results

References

External links
 

European U23 Judo Championships
 U23
European Championships, U23
Judo competitions in Poland
Judo
Judo, European Championships U23